Thamer Kamal Ali (born 12 November 1988) is a Qatari middle distance runner who specializes in the 1500 metres.

He first specialized in the steeplechase. He finished ninth at the 2005 World Youth Championships, ninth at the 2006 World Junior Championships and fifth at the 2006 Asian Games. He then competed in the 1500 metres at the 2008 World Indoor Championships and the 2008 Olympic Games without progressing to the second round. He is coached by the Italian Renato Canova.

His personal best times are:
1500 metres - 3:35.56 min (2008)
3000 metres - 7:51.61 min (2007)
5000 metres - 13:47.41 min  (2010)
3000 metres steeplechase - 8:20.29 min (2006)
10,000 metres - 29:06.1 min (2007)

References

1988 births
Living people
Qatari male middle-distance runners
Qatari male steeplechase runners
Qatari male long-distance runners
Olympic athletes of Qatar
Athletes (track and field) at the 2008 Summer Olympics
Asian Games medalists in athletics (track and field)
Athletes (track and field) at the 2006 Asian Games
Athletes (track and field) at the 2010 Asian Games
Asian Games silver medalists for Qatar
Medalists at the 2010 Asian Games